Husband is the surname of:

Agnes Husband (1852–1929), Scottish politician: one of Dundee's first female councillors and suffragette
Charles Husband (1908–1983), English architect and consulting engineer
Cody Husband (born 1988), Canadian Football League player
Deolus W. Husband (1959–1989), American composer
Gary Husband (born 1960), British jazz and rock drummer, pianist and bandleader
Herman Husband (1724–1795), American politician, radical, Quaker and preacher
Jackie Husband (1918–1992), Scottish footballer and manager
James Husband (footballer) (born 1994), English footballer
Jimmy Husband (born 1947), English retired footballer
John Husband (1839–1919), British politician
Les Husband (1898–1970), Australian rules footballer
Rick Husband (1957–2003), American astronaut
Ron Husband (born 1950), American animator
Stephen Husband (born 1990), Scottish footballer
Tom Husband (born 1936), Scottish engineer and professor
William Husband (1822–1887), British civil and mechanical engineer
William Husband (footballer), Scottish footballer in the early decades of the 20th century

See also
Husbands (surname)